East Timor, officially the Democratic Republic of Timor-Leste, is a country in Southeast Asia. It comprises the eastern half of the island of Timor, the nearby islands of Atauro and Jaco, and Oecusse, an exclave  on the northwestern side of the island, within Indonesian West Timor. East Timor was a Portuguese colony, known as Portuguese Timor, until 28 November 1975.

First stamps 

The first Portuguese colonial issues for Portuguese Timor were overprinted on stamps of Macau in 1884. A definitive set was issued in 1886.

Indonesian occupation 
During the Indonesian occupation of East Timor from 1975 to 1999, Indonesian stamps were in use.

United Nations administration 
Following the outcome of the East Timor Special Autonomy Referendum, United Nations transitional administration was established in 1999 until East Timor's independence on 20 May 2002. During the transition period, 2 stamps were issued in 2000, one for domestic mail and one for international mail.

Independence 
The first stamps of independent East Timor were issued on 20 May 2002 and were produced by Australia Post.

See also 
Correios de Timor-Leste, the national postal authority of East Timor
Postage stamps and postal history of Indonesia

References

External links
http://www.eryx.it/dentelli/text.htm The first stamps of Timor Leste

Communications in East Timor
East Timor
Philately of Portugal
History of East Timor